The 1942 Holy Cross Crusaders football team was an American football team that represented the College of the Holy Cross as an independent during the 1942 college football season.  In its first year under head coach Ank Scanlan, the team compiled a 5–4–1 record. The team played its home games at Fitton Field in Worcester, Massachusetts.

Schedule

References

Holy Cross
Holy Cross Crusaders football seasons
Holy Cross Crusaders football